Shri Shankaracharya Technical Campus (formerly Shri Shankaracharya College of Engineering and Technology (SSCET)) is an Engineering College located at Bhilai, Chhattisgarh, India. It is named after Adi Shankaracharya. Established in 1999, it is affiliated to Chhattisgarh Swami Vivekanand Technical University, Bhilai. It is a Unit of Shri Shankaracharya Group of Institutions.

History 
In 1999, it was affiliated to Pandit Ravishankar Shukla University and the yearly enrollment was 240 students. Since 2005, The College is affiliated to Chhattisgarh Swami Vivekanand Technical University.

Campus 
 The campus has a 21,000 square metre  built up area (Phase I). It has classrooms and tutorial rooms with audio and video systems teaching tools, laboratories, workshops, and an internet facility.
 The library has books, journals and CD-ROMS and a computer center. It can accommodate 450 readers at a time.
 Cafeteria, ATM, medical center, book store, telephone kiosks, recreation center, gymkhana, and indoor and outdoor games facilities.
 The picturesque Laliteshwar Temple adds peace and tranquility to the surroundings.

Programs 
   
Undergraduate programs

Currently, Faculty of Engineering & Technology, SSTC offers Bachelor of Engineering in 
  Mechanical Engineering  
  Computer Science Engineering
  Electrical and Electronics Engineering
  Electronics and Telecommunication Engineering
  Information Technology Engineering
  Electrical Engineering
  Electronics and Instrumentation Engineering
  Civil Engineering
 
   
Postgraduate programs

Currently, Faculty of Engineering & Technology, SSTC offers Master of Engineering (ME) in 
  Computer Tech & Application
  Electronics (Communication)
  Mechanical ( M/c Design)
  Electrical (Power System)
  Electronics (VLSI Design)

Departments 
Currently, Faculty of Engineering & Technology, SSTC offers has 4 departments
  Applied Physics
  Applied Chemistry
  Applied Mathematics
  Humanities

External links
 SSCET homepage
 Highereducationinindia.com
 zonalinfo.com, SSCET

Engineering colleges in Chhattisgarh
Education in Bhilai